My Gal Loves Music is a 1944 American comedy film directed by Edward C. Lilley and written by Eugene Conrad and Edward Dein. The film stars Bob Crosby, Grace McDonald, Alan Mowbray, Betty Kean, Walter Catlett and Freddie Mercer. The film was released on December 1, 1944, by Universal Pictures.

Plot

Cast        
Bob Crosby as Mel Murray
Grace McDonald as Judy Mason
Alan Mowbray as Rodney Spoonyer
Betty Kean as Peggy Quinn
Walter Catlett as Dr. Bilbo
Freddie Mercer as Clarence
Paulina Carter as Child Pianist
Tom Daly as Montague Underdunk
Gayne Whitman as Announcer
Chinita as Specialty 
Trixie as Specialty

References

External links
 

1944 films
American comedy films
1944 comedy films
Universal Pictures films
American black-and-white films
1940s English-language films
Films directed by Edward C. Lilley
1940s American films